Ferrando Bertelli (born c. 1525) was an Italian engraver of the Renaissance period. He was born in Venice.

Works 
His known works include:
 Omnium fere nentium, Sc. Ven. (1569);
 Christ curing the sick after Farinait (1530);
 The Crucifixion after Giulio Somalio;
 Venus and Cupid after Titian (1536);
 Specchio della Vite Humana (1566).

References

External link

1525 births
Year of death missing
Republic of Venice artists
Italian engravers